Married Before Breakfast is a 1937 American romantic comedy film directed by Edwin L. Marin and starring Robert Young, Florence Rice and June Clayworth.

Plot
After years of struggling, inventor Tom Wakefield sells his hair-removal invention for a quarter of a million dollars. He immediately goes on a spending spree, doing good deeds for friends and strangers alike, worrying June Baylin, his fiancée.

Kitty Brent helps him with some steamship tickets, so Tom wants to do something nice in return. Kitty says her marriage to fiancé Kenneth is on hold until he can sell an insurance policy to a milkman named Baglipp. An overly optimistic Tom assures her she'll be married by the next morning. His schemes to make Baglipp take the policy ends up getting Tom and Kitty into all kinds of trouble, including involvement with a robbery.

By morning, both their sweethearts are exasperated. June breaks off her engagement with Tom, who realizes that overnight he's fallen for Kitty. As soon as she begins feeling the same way, Tom assures her that she might end up married this very day.

Cast
Robert Young as Tom Wakefield
Florence Rice as Kitty Brent
June Clayworth as June Baylin
Barnett Parker as Tweed
Warren Hymer as Harry
Helen Flint as Miss Fleeter
Irene Franklin as Mrs. Baglipp
Hugh Marlowe as Kenneth
Tom Kennedy as Mr. Baglipp
Edgar Dearing as Police Sergeant

Reception
According to MGM records the movie earned $319,000 in the US and Canada and $129,000 elsewhere, resulting in a profit of $90,000.

References

External links

Married Before Breakfast at TCMDB

1937 films
Metro-Goldwyn-Mayer films
1930s English-language films
1937 romantic comedy films
American romantic comedy films
American black-and-white films
Films directed by Edwin L. Marin
1930s American films